The 2000 Potters Holidays World World Indoor Bowls Championship  was held at Potters Leisure Resort, Hopton on Sea, Great Yarmouth, England, from 10–23 January 2000, with the pairs following on from 26 to 29 January 2000.

In the singles Robert Weale won the title beating John Price in the final.

In the pairs final David Gourlay & Alex Marshall defeated Gary Smith & Andy Thomson.

The women's singles competition took place at the Watson Stadium in Belfast from April 13–16. The event was sponsored by Golden Charter and the title was won by Marlene Castle.

Winners

Draw and results

First round

Men's singles

Men's Pairs

Women's singles

References

External links 
Official website

World Indoor Bowls Championship
2000 in bowls